Broomtown is an extinct town in Chattooga County, in the U.S. state of Georgia.

History
The community has the name of an Indian chieftain, "(Old) Broom".

References

Geography of Chattooga County, Georgia
Ghost towns in Georgia (U.S. state)